Iridagonum is a genus of ground beetles in the family Carabidae. There are about nine described species in Iridagonum, found in Indonesia and New Guinea.

Species
These nine species belong to the genus Iridagonum:
 Iridagonum caudostriatum Louwerens, 1969
 Iridagonum fessum Darlington, 1971
 Iridagonum laeve Louwerens, 1969
 Iridagonum quadripunctellum Darlington, 1952
 Iridagonum quadripunctum Darlington, 1952
 Iridagonum septimum Darlington, 1971
 Iridagonum sexpunctum Darlington, 1952
 Iridagonum subfusum Darlington, 1952
 Iridagonum vigil Darlington, 1971

References

Platyninae